Transtillaspis galbana is a species of moth of the family Tortricidae. It is found in Ecuador in Napo, Morona-Santiago, Zamora-Chinchipe, Carchi and Sucumbios provinces.

The wingspan is 18–21 mm. The ground colour of the forewings is ochreous cinnamon dotted with dark brown, mainly in the distal third of the wing. The hindwings are brownish grey with paler spots.

Etymology
The species name refers to colouration of the forewings and is derived from Greek/Latin galbanum (meaning a kind of resin).

References

Moths described in 2005
Transtillaspis
Moths of South America
Taxa named by Józef Razowski